Le Quartier Français is a restaurant and hotel in Franschhoek, South Africa near Stellenbosch. The property has thirteen rooms, eight suites and a cottage that overlook a landscaped garden with a natural pool.The restaurant ranked  36th best restaurant in the world in Restaurant magazine's Top 50 in 2011. From 1996-2017 the head chef was Margot Janse. It is regarded as the best restaurant in Africa and the Middle East.

See also
 List of hotels in South Africa
 List of restaurants in South Africa

References

External links
Le Quartier Français Website

Restaurants in South Africa
Hotels in South Africa
Tourism in the Western Cape